Listen to Barry Harris (subtitled Solo Piano) is a solo album by pianist Barry Harris recorded in 1960 and released on the Riverside label.

Reception

Allmusic awarded the album 4 stars with its review by Jim Todd stating, "Split between standards and originals, the set hears the 31-year-old pianist evoking Art Tatum, Bud Powell, Thelonious Monk, and occasional hints of Fats Waller in performances that defy easy classification as bop, swing, or mainstream. Essentially, it's Harris working within the songs, opening up new pathways in and around the melodic and harmonic structures".

Track listing 
All compositions by Barry Harris except as indicated
 "The Londonderry Air" (Traditional) - 4:10    
 "Mutattra" - 3:14    
 "Louise" (Leo Robin, Richard A. Whiting) - 3:43    
 "Body and Soul" (Frank Eyton, Johnny Green, Edward Heyman, Robert Sour) - 4:01    
 "Ascension" - 3:48    
 "Anachronism" - 4:51    
 "I Didn't Know What Time It Was" (Lorenz Hart, Richard Rodgers) - 4:53    
 "Teenie" - 3:42    
 "Sphere" - 4:01    
 "Dancing in the Dark" (Howard Dietz, Arthur Schwartz) - 2:07

Personnel 
Barry Harris - piano

References 

Barry Harris albums
1961 albums
Riverside Records albums
Albums produced by Orrin Keepnews
Solo piano jazz albums